or  is a fjord in Nordland county, Norway. There are several large islands in the fjord as well: Finnøya to the north and Lundøya and Engeløya at the mouth of the fjord where it joins the Vestfjorden.

The village of Karlsøy is on Finnøya on the north shore of the fjord and the villages of Innhavet and Tømmerneset both lie at the innermost parts of the fjord in the east.

See also
 List of Norwegian fjords

References

Hamarøy
Steigen
Fjords of Nordland